The 1st Congress of the Philippines (Filipino: Unang Kongreso ng Pilipinas), composed of the Philippine Senate and House of Representatives, met from May 25, 1946, until December 13, 1949, during the 22-month presidency of Manuel Roxas and the first two years of Elpidio Quirino's presidency. The body was originally convened as the Second Congress of the Commonwealth of the Philippines. On August 5, 1946, Republic Act No. 6 was approved, renaming the body as the First Congress of the Philippines.

Sessions

The Second Congress of the Commonwealth of the Philippines 
 Regular Session: May 25 – July 4, 1946

The First Congress of the Philippines 
 First Regular Session: July 5 – September 18, 1946
 First Special Session: September 25–30, 1946
 Second Regular Session: January 27 – May 22, 1947
 Third Regular Session: January 26 – May 20, 1948
 Second Special Session: June 14–26, 1948
 Fourth Regular Session: January 24 – May 19, 1949
 Special Joint Session: December 13, 1949

Legislation 
The Second Commonwealth Congress passed a total of 12 laws: Commonwealth Acts No. 721 to 733.
The First Congress of the Philippines passed a total of 421 laws: Republic Acts No. 1 to 421.

Leadership

Senate 
 President of the Senate:
José D. Avelino (LP)
Mariano Jesús D. Cuenco (LP), elected February 21, 1949
 Senate President Pro-Tempore:
Melecio Arranz (LP)
 Majority Floor Leader:
Vicente J. Francisco
Tomas L. Cabili (LP) elected February 21, 1949
 Minority Floor Leader:
Carlos P. Garcia (NP)

House of Representatives 
 Speaker:
Eugenio P. Perez (LP, 2nd District Pangasinan)
 Speaker Pro-Tempore:
Francisco Ortega (LP, 1st District La Union)
 Majority Floor Leader:
Raúl Leuterio (LP, Lone District Mindoro)
 Minority Floor Leader:
Cipriano P. Primicias, Sr. (NP, 4th District Pangasinan)

Members

Senate 
Sixteen senators were elected on April 23, 1946. Eight senators were to serve until December 30, 1949, while the other eight were to serve until December 30, 1951.

Notes

House of Representatives 

Notes

See also 
 Congress of the Philippines
 Senate of the Philippines
 House of Representatives of the Philippines
 1946 Philippine general election

External links

Further reading 
 Philippine House of Representatives Congressional Library
 
 

01
Third Philippine Republic